Dark Forest (lit. “Forest of Death”) is a 2006 South Korean film and the final installment of the 4 Horror Tales film series.

Cast
So Yi-hyun
Lee Jong-hyuk
Kim Young-joon
Choi Seong-min
Park Choong-seon

External links
 
 
 

2006 films
2006 horror films
2000s Korean-language films
South Korean zombie films
2000s South Korean films